The 4th Revolution: Energy Autonomy, also known as Die 4. Revolution – Energy Autonomy, is a German documentary film about renewable energy by Carl-A. Fechner, released in 2010. It depicts a vision for a global society that obtains 100% of its energy from renewable sources and the complete reconstruction of the economy that this will require.

Production took four years and was financed by individuals. Parts of the film were made in 10 different countries, showing existing pioneer projects in different cultures, from those funded by Nobel Peace Prize laureate Muhammed Yunus through micro-credit, to the vision of the Right Livelihood Award laureate Hermann Scheer of Eurosolar, to modern businesses working in the renewable energy sector. The film launched in cinemas in Germany March 18, 2010 and had its U.S. premiere at the San Francisco Green Film Festival in March 2011.

In the German trailer to the film, the revolution in capitalist ownership of energy resources is stressed; Hermann Scheer says that "instead of a few owners we will have hundreds of thousands..." and "energy supply will be democratized". The film embodies the philosophy of Hermann Scheer, who died in 2010.

See Also 
Fourth Industrial Revolution

References

External links
 
 
 project website

2010 films
2010 documentary films
German documentary films
2010s German-language films
Documentary films about alternative energy
2010 in the environment
Renewable energy
2010s German films